is a Japanese tokusatsu television series created by Go Nagai and Ken Ishikawa and produced by Toyo Agency, Dynamic Productions and KNOCK in 1976. It was originally aired on Mondays, from 19:30 to 20:00 in Tokyo Channel 12 between October 1976 to March 1977. A manga series was also created, featuring a different story and serialized in the magazine Boken Oh (Akita Shoten).

External links
Battle Hawk at Japan Hero Encyclopedia
 Battle Hawk at allcinema
 Battle Hawk (manga) at D/visual
 Battle Hawk & Aztecaser (manga) at The World of Go Nagai webpage

1976 Japanese television series debuts
1977 Japanese television series endings
Go Nagai
Ken Ishikawa
Tokusatsu television series
TV Tokyo original programming